WBDC (100.9 FM) is a radio station broadcasting a country music format.  Licensed to Huntingburg, Indiana, United States, the station is currently owned by Dubois County Broadcasting, Inc. and features programming from CNN Radio, and Westwood One.  The station is also broadcast on HD radio.

References

External links

BDC
Country radio stations in the United States